Beyblade Burst is a 2016 Japanese anime series and the third incarnation of the Beyblade series. The series was produced by D-rights and TV Tokyo and animated by OLM, and it premiered on all TXN stations in Japan on April 4, 2016. An English version of the anime premiered in Canada on Teletoon on September 10, 2016 and on Disney XD on October 2. The series also premiered on 9Go! in Australia on December 5, 2016, and on Disney XD in the United States on December 19, 2016. The opening theme for the series is "Burst Finish!", by Tatsuyuki Kobayashi, while the ending theme is "Believe", by Shiklamen. The English theme for the season is "Our Time" by Shaun Chasin.


Episode list

References

Burst Season 1
2016 Japanese television seasons
2017 Japanese television seasons